David R. Gius (born August 23, 1960) is an American physician-scientist the Zell Family Scholar Professor, Women's Cancer Research Program director, and Vice Chair of Translational Research at Northwestern University's Feinberg School of Medicine Department of Radiation Oncology and Pharmacology. His research focuses into the mechanistic connection between aging, cellular and/or mitochondrial metabolism, and carcinogenesis focusing on the Sirtuin gene family.

Education 
Gius graduated from the University of Illinois at Chicago in 1983 with an undergraduate degree in chemistry. He completed his Ph.D. at the University of Chicago in 1983, and his M.D. at the Loyola University of Chicago Strich School of Medicine in 1992.

Career 
He did his postdoctoral work in the Molecular Genetics and Cell Biology Department at the University of Chicago in 1993, with Vikas P. Sukhatme and Tom Curran. Afterwards, he moved to St. Louis, MO where he did his residency in Radiation Oncology Resident at the Radiation Oncology Center, Mallinckrodt Institute of Radiology, Washington University School of Medicine. He then served between 1997-2001 as Assistant Professor and Residency Director of the division and the Section of Cancer Biology. Between 2001 and 2009 he was the Chief of the National Cancer Institute’s (NCI) Molecular Radiation Oncology Section. He was also residency director of NCC Radiation Oncology Residency, clinical director of GYN services in the Center for Cancer Research, and a researcher with the NCI in Bethesda, MD. In 2005 he became the Associate Program Director of the National Institutes of Health (NIH) Oxford-Cambridge Scholars Program and the Trans-NIH MD/PhD Partnership Program. Prior to his current appointment at Northwestern University, he was the Clinical Chief and an Associate Professor (2009-2012) in the Departments of Cancer Biology, Pediatrics, and Radiation Oncology, in the Vanderbilt-Ingram Cancer Center, Vanderbilt University School of Medicine, Nashville, TN.

Selected publications 

 Lysine 68 acetylation directs MnSOD as a tetrameric detoxification complex versus a monomeric tumor promoter. Nature Commun. 10:2399-2414, 2019.
 Circadian Clock NAD+ Cycle Drives Mitochondrial Oxidative Metabolism in Mice. Science. 342:1243417, 2013.
SIRT2 Maintains Genome Integrity and Suppresses Tumorigenesis through Regulating APC/C Activity. Cancer Cell. 20:487-499, 2011.
Sirt3-Mediated Deacetylation of Evolutionarily Conserved Lysine 122 Regulates MnSOD Activity in Response to Stress. Molecular Cell. 40:893-904, 2010.
SIRT3 is a Mitochondria-Localized Tumor Suppressor Required for Maintenance of Mitochondrial Integrity and Metabolism during Stress. Cancer Cell. 17:41-52, 2010.

Awards 

 Fellow of American Society of Therapeutic Radiation Oncology (FASTRO) designation, American Society of Therapeutic Radiation Oncology (2018)
 Member of Alpha Omega Alpha (AOA) Honor Medical Society, American Medical Society (2014)
 Radiation Oncology Teacher of the Year 2001, Radiation Oncology Center Mallinckrodt Institute of Radiology Washington University School of Medicine (2001)
 Howard Hughes Research Fellowship, Department of Medicine, the University of Chicago (1989)

References 

Living people
1960 births
University of Illinois Chicago alumni
University of Chicago alumni
Loyola University Chicago alumni
21st-century American physicians
20th-century American physicians
Washington University School of Medicine faculty
Physicians from Illinois
Vanderbilt University faculty
Cancer researchers
National Institutes of Health people
Northwestern Medicine faculty